Fernando Ezequiel Juárez (born 23 August 1998) is an Argentine professional footballer who plays as a midfielder for Maltese club, Floriana, on loan from Argentine Primera División side Talleres de Córdoba.

Career
Juárez signed for Talleres in 2010. He first appeared in the Talleres first-team squad during the 2016 Primera B Nacional campaign, making his professional debut on 12 February in a 2–1 victory over Villa Dálmine. It was the first of six appearances in 2016, a season which ended with promotion to the Argentine Primera División. In 2018, Juárez represented the club's U20 team at the 2018 U-20 Copa Libertadores in Uruguay.

Career statistics
.

Honours
Talleres
Primera B Nacional: 2016

References

External links

1998 births
Living people
Argentine footballers
Argentine expatriate footballers
People from Santiago del Estero
Association football midfielders
Sportspeople from Santiago del Estero Province
Primera Nacional players
Argentine Primera División players
Maltese Premier League players
Talleres de Córdoba footballers
Audax Italiano footballers
Club Agropecuario Argentino players
Floriana F.C. players
Argentine expatriate sportspeople in Malta
Expatriate footballers in Malta
Argentine expatriate sportspeople in Chile
Expatriate footballers in Chile